Strophocheilidae is a taxonomic family of air-breathing land snails, terrestrial pulmonate gastropod mollusks in the superfamily Acavoidea (according to the taxonomy of the Gastropoda by Bouchet & Rocroi, 2005).

Fossil record
The genus Eoborus is the family's oldest fossil record, dating from the Middle Paleocene of Brazil (Itaboraí Basin) and Uruguay (Santa Lucía Basin).

Genera 
The family Strophocheilidae consists of two subfamilies and genera including:

subfamily Strophocheilinae Pilsbry, 1902
 Anthinus Albers, 1850
 Austroborus Parodiz, 1949
 Chiliborus Pilsbry, 1926
 Gonyostomus Beck, 1837
 Mirinaba Morretes, 1952
 Speironepion Bequaert, 1948
 Strophocheilus Spix, 1827 - type genus of the family Strophocheilidae

subfamily Megalobuliminae Leme, 1973
 Megalobulimus K. Miller, 1878 - type genus of the subfamily Megalobuliminae

[unassigned] Strophocheilidae (temporary name):
  Eoborus Klappenbach & Olazarri, 1970
  Maghrebiola Kadolsky & Hammouda, 2017 

Genera brought into synonymy
 Borus Albers, 1850: synonym of Megalobulimus K. Miller, 1878
 Coniclus Albers, 1850: synonym of Strophocheilus Spix in J. A. Wagner, 1827
 Goniostomus auct.: synonym of Gonyostomus H. Beck, 1837 (incorrect subsequent spelling)
 Gonyostoma Swainson, 1840: synonym of Gonyostomus H. Beck, 1837
 Metara Morretes, 1955: synonym of Mirinaba Morretes, 1955
 Microborus Pilsbry, 1926: synonym of Austroborus Parodiz, 1949 (unavailable, a junior homonym of Blandford, 1897 [Coleoptera])
 Phaiopharus Morretes, 1955: synonym of Megalobulimus K. Miller, 1878
 Psiloicus Morretes, 1955: synonym of Megalobulimus K. Miller, 1878

References

External links